This is a list of notable private schools in Atlanta:

Atlanta proper

*Atlanta Girls' School
Atlanta International School
Atlanta Speech School
The Galloway School
Holy Innocents' Episcopal School
Holy Spirit Preparatory School
The Lovett School
Pace Academy
Trinity School
The Paideia School
The Schenck School
The Westminster Schools

Atlanta metropolitan area

Atlanta Jewish Academy in Sandy Springs and Doraville
Blessed Trinity Catholic High School in Roswell
Brandon Hall School in Sandy Springs
Eagle's Landing Christian Academy in McDonough
The Epstein School in Sandy Springs
Greater Atlanta Christian School in Norcross
Holy Innocents' Episcopal School in Sandy Springs
Lyndon Academy in Woodstock
Marist School in Dunwoody
McGinnis Woods Country Day School in Alpharetta
Mount Vernon Presbyterian School in Sandy Springs
Mount Pisgah Christian School in John's Creek
Our Lady of Mercy Catholic High School in Fayetteville
Providence Christian Academy in Lilburn
St. Pius X Catholic High School in Chamblee
Springmont Montessori in Sandy Springs
Strong Rock Christian School in Locust Grove, Georgia
The Walker School in Marietta
Weber School in Sandy Springs
Wesleyan School in Peachtree Corners
Woodward Academy in College Park

See also 
 List of schools in Georgia (U.S. state)#Fulton County

References

Schools
Atlanta